Canal 4 is a Salvadoran television channel owned by Telecorporación Salvadoreña which broadcasts on channel 4 nationwide.
It has a general schedule similar to its sister channels on weekdays and focuses more on sports during weekends. A HD feed of the channel is also available nationwide.

Television stations in El Salvador
1958 establishments in El Salvador
Telecorporación Salvadoreña
Spanish-language television stations
Television channels and stations established in 1958